Twickenham Streaker can apply to people who have streaked at Twickenham Stadium:

 Michael O'Brien in 1974, famously photographed by Ian Bradshaw
 Erica Roe in 1982